WWCR is a shortwave radio station located in Nashville, Tennessee in the United States. WWCR uses four 100 kW transmitters to broadcast on about a dozen frequencies.

WWCR mainly leases out its four transmitters to religious organizations and speakers, as well as serving as the shortwave home of Genesis Communications Network's programs. However, it does air a few hours of original programming per week.

F.W. Robbert Broadcasting also owns the AM (mediumwave) stations WNQM in Nashville, WMQM and WLRM in Memphis, WITA in Knoxville, and WVOG in New Orleans. Some of WWCR's programming is also broadcast on these local stations.

History 
Originally known as 'World Wide Country Radio,' WWCR began broadcasting a country format but quickly switched to a standard evangelical Christian format, also selling leased airtime. Because of the station's policy of leasing airtime, WWCR acquired an early reputation for carrying an eclectic mix of political and entertainment programming in addition to the religious programs. Among those, past as well as present, making their shortwave debut on WWCR, are:
 "Essentials of Life & Wellness" hosted by Dr. Will Wong
The Hour of the Time, hosted by Bill Cooper
 Radio Free America hosted by Tom Valentine, sponsored by Carotec Health newspaper
 For the People hosted by Chuck Harder
 Newswatch Magazine hosted by David J. Smith
 Radio Newyork International hosted by Allan Weiner
 World of Radio hosted by Glenn Hauser
Rich Salzer Show
Conservative Preterist Church
 
 Dr Gene Scott, with "The University Network" from California
 Mark Koernke, a self-proclaimed militia leader, aka "Mark From Michigan," host of "The Intelligence Report"
 Unshackled, the show of the Pacific Garden Mission
 Rick Tyler, the Voice of Liberty
 John Anderson, the Voice of Reason, Preterist Christian show

 Freedom Call hosted by Lt. Col. James (Bo) Gritz
 Rollye James, Libertarian
 Pat Kiley, hosting "Follow the Money" with cohost Robert Chapman who became Melody Cedarstrom's cohost in the same timeslot after Kiley was indicted for complicity in a Ponzi scheme
 James McCanney, hosting his revisionist Science Hour At the Crossroads 
 Dave Mooney, host of World Wide Country music show.
 The Alex Jones Show
 Joyce Riley and The Power Hour

WWCR is also notable for a December 1997 broadcast by Ted Gunderson which later became the subject of a court case. In that case, lawyers for Art Bell claimed that the broadcast had implied he had been charged with child molestation. A defamation lawsuit against the station was settled in October 2000 and Art Bell claimed that WWCR had apologized for the incident. Ted Gunderson disputes that any apology was ever made and asserts that the case was entirely baseless. The majority of the political commentary on the station is of a conservative or ultra-conservative nature with extensive discussion on conspiracy theories.

Transmitters

WWCR-1 
   3.215 MHz 02:00 - 09:59 UTC
 15.795 MHz 10:00 - 12:59 UTC
 15.825 MHz 13:00 - 21:59 UTC
   6.115 MHz 22:00 - 01:59 UTC

WWCR-2 
   5.935 MHz 01:00 - 12:59 UTC
   7.49 MHz 13:00 - 15:59 UTC
 12.16 MHz 16:00 - 20:59 UTC
   9.35 MHz 21:00 - 22:59 UTC
   5.07 MHz 23:00 - 00:59 UTC

WWCR-3 
   4.84 MHz 01:00 - 12:59 UTC
 13.845 MHz 13:00 - 00:59 UTC

WWCR-4 
   7.52 MHz 00:00 - 02:59 UTC
   5.89 MHz 03:00 - 12:59 UTC
   9.98 MHz 13:00 - 23:59 UTC

References

External links 
 WWCR-Shortwave official site
 Current transmitter schedules
 Current program schedule
  FCC information for WWCR (not up-to-date)

WCR
WCR
Shortwave radio stations in the United States
Radio stations established in 1989
1989 establishments in Tennessee